Sheikh Ibrahim mosque is a historical mosque of the XV century. It is a part of Old City and located on A.Zeynalli street, in the city of Baku, in Azerbaijan.

History

On the inscription on facade, it is noted that the customer of the mosque was Hаji Amirshаh ibn Yаgub. On another inscription, it is indicated that the mosque was restored by Agha Gafar Haji Murad oghlu. The main writing show that the mosque was built in 1415-1416 (838 of Hijri calendar), during reign of Sultan Sheikh Ibrahim. For this reason the monument was named after Sheikh Ibrahim by local residents.

Architectural features
The mosque is in quadrangle form. It is covered with a stone dome. Mihrab is not on the side wall as traditionally, but on the long wall. In the nineteenth century, surface of the facade wall of the mosque was divided into three quadrangular frames. It led the facade to get the shape of architectural school of Europe. Within each frame, windows were installed, which were completed with cracks and the entrance were developed in the form of portal. The ancient content of the national cultural monument is kept and national and European motifs are combined as a united architectural platform.

See also
Jinn Mosque
Sayyid Yahya Murtuza Mosque
Khidir Mosque
Juma Mosque

References

Monuments and memorials in Azerbaijan
Mosques in Baku
Icherisheher